Colleen Faulkner (also known by the alternate pen names Hunter Morgan and V. K. Forrest) is an American author of romance novels. In 1999 she was presented with the "Diamond Award" for literary excellence in the state of Delaware.

Bibliography
Vampire Fia Kahill written as V.K. Forrest
 Eternal
 Undying
 Immortal

External links
Hunter Morgan's website
V K Forrest at fantasticfiction.com
Colleen Faulkner at fantasticfiction.com

Year of birth missing (living people)
Living people
20th-century American novelists
American romantic fiction writers
American women novelists
Writers from Delaware
Women romantic fiction writers
20th-century American women writers
21st-century American women